Changbai may refer to:

Changbai Mountains, mountain range on the border between China and North Korea
Changbai Mountain, or Baekdu Mountain, volcanic mountain on the border between North Korea and China
Changbai Waterfall, in Baekdu Mountain in the Changbai Mountains
Changbai Korean Autonomous County, in Jilin, China